The Active-class frigate was a 32-gun fifth-rate frigate class of eight ships designed by Edward Hunt to replace the  design, which they resembled with a distinct midsection. Due to poor performance of the Active class, orders continued for the Amazon class.

Description
They displaced  tons burthen. The class was designed with an armament of 26  cannon on the gundeck, four  guns on the quarterdeck with four  carronades, and two 6 pdr guns and two 24 pdr carronades on the forecastle.

Ships in class
 - wrecked attempting to exit Castle Harbour, Bermuda, via Castle Roads
 – wrecked on Anticosti Island in the St Lawrence estuary 13 July 1796, abandoned 30 July 1796.
 - broken up July 1811.
 – broken up 1816
 – wrecked on Anegada Island in the Virgin Islands 23 March 1808.
 – broken up 1830.
 – broken up 1830.
 - broken up November 1815.

References
 

Age of Sail frigates of the United Kingdom